Trickem is the name of two communities in Alabama:

Trickem, Cleburne County, Alabama
Trickem, Lowndes County, Alabama